The Brandenburg-Rundfahrt was a stage road cycling race that was held in Brandenburg, Germany. The race was on the UCI calendar in category 2.5 from 2001 to 2003. It was not held from 2004 through 2006, but returned for 2007 and 2008 as a national level race.

Winners

References

Cycle races in Germany
2001 establishments in Germany
2008 disestablishments in Germany
Recurring sporting events established in 2001
Recurring sporting events disestablished in 2008
Defunct cycling races in Germany
Sport in Brandenburg